The Badia di Passignano, also called the Abbey of San Michele Arcangelo a Passignano is a historic Benedictine abbey located atop a scenic hilltop, surrounded by cypresses, east of the town of Tavarnelle Val di Pesa, Province of Florence, Italy. The abbey complex is located about 2 kilometres east of the Siena-Florence autostrada. The settlement is also a frazione of Barberino Tavarnelle.

History
Documents citing the abbey date to the 890s during the Lombard era. By the year 1049 when a prior hermitage was donated to John Gualbert, the founder of the Vallombrosan Order. The abbey became one of the major sites of the order and itself a wealthy landowner by the mid-14th century. Refurbished and altered over the centuries, in 1866 the monks were expelled and the site was sold to private owners, one of whom created some of the faux crenellations and towers. In the 20th century, the abbey was restored to a small monastic order.

Outside of the cloistered abbey complex is the Romanesque 12th-century church of San Michele Arcangelo; the church has undergone numerous reconstructions. In the attached small hamlet of Passignano is the parish church of San Biagio, built in 1080. The abbey in the 19th-century housed a remarkable collection of over 6000 parchment manuscripts, many brought here by Grand-Duke Leopold.

The abbey is known for a number of frescoes, created by artists over a number of centuries, including works by Filippo di Antonio Filippelli, Benedetto Veli, Alessandro Pieroni, Alessandro Allori, Bernardo di Stefano Rosselli, Giuseppe Nicola Nasini, and Domenico Passignano

The refectory houses frescoes by Domenico Ghirlandaio and his brother Davide. The frescoes have been much restored over the last century.

Gallery of Frescoes

References

Monasteries in Tuscany
Christian monasteries established in the 11th century
Tavarnelle Val di Pesa
Buildings and structures in Barberino Tavarnelle
Passignano